6:6:6 is a split CD between Smackin' Isaiah (a.k.a. A Wilhelm Scream), Moronique and Merrick. The album got the title 6:6:6 because each band has 6 songs each on the album. It was released on a small indie label called Tank Records which was run by John Carvalho, Smackin' Isaiah guitarist.  The album had a short run of no more than 2000 copies and as of 2009 is quite rare.

This album is the follow-up to Smackin' Isaiah's second cassette release entitled Gets Eaten Alive!.

Track listing
Smackin Isaiah
Studying The Sidewalk
Today's Special
How To Set Yourself On Fire
The Devil Lives In Massachusetts
It Never Happened
Don't Wake Me Up
Moronique
 Belong
 The Edge
 College Trends
 Elevated
 Hollow
 The Lost Story
Merrick
 Blue Light Night
 Present Past
 Sell Me
 Untried
 In Silence
 Amusement Park

Personnel

Band members
Smackin' Isaiah
Nuno Pereira – vocals
Trevor Reilly – guitar / vocals
John Carvalho – guitar
Jonathan Teves – bass / vocals
Nicholas Pasquale Angelini – drums

Moronique
Sosa Kodaj – vocals / guitar
Rudi Las Vegas – guitar
Thomas Kaim – bass / vocals
Andi Schwab – drums

Merrick
Marco – vocals / guitar
Kelly – vocals / bass
James – guitar
Nick – drums / keyboard

Other contributors
Joe Reilly - Recording, engineering, mixing and production for Smackin' Isaiah
Smackin' Isaiah - Production for Smackin' Isaiah
Noszticius Vilmos - Recording, engineering, mixing and production for Moronique
Moronique - Production for Moronique
Willie Samuels - Recording, engineering, mixing and production for Merrick
Merrick - Production for Merrick

References 

A Wilhelm Scream albums
2000 albums